The Sanremo Music Festival 1974 was the 24th annual Sanremo Music Festival, held at the Casinò Municipale in Sanremo, province of Imperia between 7 and 9 March 1974. The final night was broadcast by Rai 1, while the first two nights were broadcast live only by radio.

The show was presented by  Corrado, assisted by Gabriella Farinon. Gianni Ravera, Vittorio Salvetti and Elio Gigante served as artistic directors.  

The winner of the Festival was Iva Zanicchi with the song "Ciao cara come stai?".

Participants and results

References 

Sanremo Music Festival by year
1974 in Italian music
1974 music festivals